George Walter Stonier or G. W. Stonier (1903 – 1985) was an English critic, novelist and radio playwright, and a literary editor of the New Statesman. He wrote a weekly column for the New Statesman for twenty years until 1961 under the pseudonym William Whitebait. He  was an adapter of Gustave Flaubert's Bouvard et Pécuchet, and his radio plays included Ophelia, The Shadow Across the Page, The House Opposite and Chap in a Bowler Hat.  He was a contributor to The Observer, The Daily Telegraph, literary journals and Sight & Sound. He was also author of the well-regarded novella Memoirs of a Ghost and of six other books:Shaving Through the  Blitz, Shadow Across the Page, Gog Magog, My Dear Bunny, Across London with the Unicorn, and Pictures on the Pavement illustrated by Edward Ardizzone.  He was the first to translate Jules Renard's classic tale of an unloved child, Poil de Carotte into English. It was published (as Carrots) in 1946 by the Grey Walls Press in an edition illustrated by Fred Uhlman.

Selected list of works 

 Pictures on the Pavement (London: Michael Joseph, 1955). Illustrated by Edward Ardizzone
 Gog, Magog and other critical essays (London: J. M. Dent and Sons, Ltd., 1933)
 The Memoirs of a Ghost (Grey Walls Press, 1947)
 The English Countryside in Colour (London: B. T. Batsford, Ltd., 1957)
 My Dear Bunny (Homeand van Thal, 1946)
 The Shadow Across the Page (London: Cresset Press, [n.d.])
 Shaving through the Blitz (London: Jonathan Cape, 1943)
 Enchanted Park

Contributions to other works 

 Gissing, George, New Grub Street (Oxford University Press, World's Classics, 1958). Introduction by G. W. Stonier
 Stonier, G. W. (ed.); with illustrations by Nicolas Bentley, New Statesman Competitions (London: Faber and Faber, 1946)
 Renard, Jules; translated into English by G. W. Stonier, and with drawings by Fred Uhlman, Carrots [Poil de carotte] (London: Grey Walls Press, 1946
 Flaubert, Gustave; translated into English by T. W. Earp and G. W. Stonier, Bouvard and Pécuchet (London: Jonathan Cape, 1936)

References

External links

Review of Memoirs of a Ghost
Essay on Stonier and  Memoirs of a Ghost
  – all under "Stonier, George Walter"

1903 births
1985 deaths
People educated at Westminster School, London
20th-century English novelists